is a Japanese retired pair skater and six-time Japanese national champion (2009-2012, 2014, 2015).  With former partner Mervin Tran, she was the 2012 World bronze medalist, the 2010 Junior World silver medalist, and the 2010–11 Junior Grand Prix Final champion. They were the first pair to win a World medal for Japan. She has also skated with Ryo Shibata, Ryuichi Kihara and Alexandr Zaboev.

Personal life 
Narumi Takahashi was born in Chiba Prefecture, Japan. Her father's job took the family to China when she was nine. She lived in China for five years. She moved to Montreal, Quebec, Canada to train with Tran in 2007. As a result, Takahashi is fluent in Japanese, Mandarin and English. In addition to skating, Takahashi also played soccer for six years on a city team.

Career

Early career 
Narumi Takahashi began skating at age five, following in the footsteps of her elder sister. She won the Japanese bronze medal in novice B ladies' singles in 2002.

After moving to China at the age of nine, Takahashi continued skating in singles until she was about 12–13 and then switched to pair skating. She skated with Chinese partner Gao Yu for one season; they placed 6th at the 2004 Chinese Championships on the senior level. She decided to leave China and skate for Japan so she asked the Japanese federation for help in finding a partner; she eventually found a partner in Japan but the partnership was unsuccessful due to insufficient height difference.

Partnership with Tran 

Takahashi moved to Montreal, Quebec after two years of corresponding with Richard Gauthier, whom she met at a competition in China. Gauthier began looking for a partner for her in Canada. Bruno Marcotte recommended Mervin Tran, who until that point had been a single skater. Tran agreed to come to Montreal for a tryout and the pair began training together in July 2007. During their career together, they trained in St. Leonard and received funding from the Japanese skating association.

Takahashi/Tran made their international debut on the 2007–2008 ISU Junior Grand Prix, where they placed 12th and 6th at their events. They won the Japan Junior Championships and earned a trip to 2008 Junior Worlds, where they placed 15th.

In the 2008–2009 season, Takahashi/Tran placed 4th at their first Junior Grand Prix event. They won the bronze medal at their second event, qualifying them for the 2008-2009 ISU Junior Grand Prix Final, where they placed 7th. They won the senior title at the 2008–2009 Japanese Championships. At the 2009 Junior Worlds, they placed 7th.

During the 2009–2010 season, Takahashi/Tran competed on the Junior Grand Prix circuit. They won the bronze medal at their first event and gold at their second event, which qualified them for the 2009–2010 Junior Grand Prix Final. They also debuted on the senior Grand Prix series with an 8th-place finish at NHK Trophy. They won silver at the JGP Final and at the Junior World Championships. They became the second pair representing Japan to medal at an ISU Championships (Yuko Kavaguti / Alexander Markuntsov were the first pair when they won silver in 2001).

During the 2010–2011 season, Takahashi/Tran won silver medals at their JGP events and qualified for the Junior Grand Prix Final. They won gold at the event, becoming the first pair representing Japan to win the title. They also won their first medals on the senior Grand Prix series, a bronze at 2010 NHK Trophy, and then silver at 2010 Cup of Russia. As a result, they were first alternates to the senior Grand Prix Final. They won the bronze medal at the 2011 Junior Worlds. They also made their senior World Championships debut, finishing 9th.

During the 2011–2012 season, Takahashi/Tran's first Grand Prix assignment was 2011 Skate Canada International, where they finished fourth. They won the silver medal at their second event, 2011 NHK Trophy. In November 2011, Tran said he was considering pursuing Japanese citizenship in order to allow the couple to compete at the Olympics but said it was a difficult decision because it would mean giving up his Canadian citizenship. They became the first Japanese pair to qualify for the senior Grand Prix Final.

At the 2012 World Championships, Takahashi/Tran placed third in both programs and won the bronze medal. They became the first pair to medal for Japan at a senior World Championships. They placed third at the 2012 World Team Trophy. In April 2012, Tran said he would continue to consider an application for Japanese citizenship and the president of the Japanese Olympic Committee said he was "willing to make a special request (on behalf of Tran) to the government if necessary." In May 2012, a government official said it would be difficult to naturalize Tran because he had never resided in Japan.

In April 2012, Takahashi dislocated her left shoulder while practicing a lift. After five or six recurrences, she decided to undergo surgery on October 30. As a result, the pair withdrew from their 2012–2013 Grand Prix events, the 2012 Cup of China and 2012 NHK Trophy. They said they would miss about four to six months. On December 18, 2012, the Japanese Skating Federation announced that the pair had ended their partnership.

Partnership with Kihara 
The JSF said they hoped to find a new partner, with preference to skaters holding Japanese citizenship, by February 2013. On January 30, 2013, the JSF confirmed that Takahashi had teamed up with Ryuichi Kihara, until then a singles skater, and would be coached by Yuka Sato and Jason Dungjen. They trained in Bloomfield Hills, Michigan. They represented Japan together at the 2014 Olympics and placed 19th. They pair split in March 2015.

Partnership with Zaboev 
On July 6, 2015, it was announced that Takahashi had teamed up with Russian pair skater Alexandr Zaboev and that Takahashi would continue to skate for Japan with him.

Partnership with Shibata 
On May 18, 2016, it was announced that Takahashi had teamed up with retired single skater Ryo Shibata and that they would train in Chicago.

Programs

With Kihara

With Tran

Competitive highlights 
GP: Grand Prix; CS: Challenger Series; JGP: Junior Grand Prix

With Shibata

With Kihara

With Tran

With Yamada

With Gao

Ladies' singles

References

External links 

 
 
 

1992 births
Living people
Asian Games competitors for Japan
Figure skaters at the 2014 Winter Olympics
Figure skaters at the 2017 Asian Winter Games
Japanese expatriate sportspeople in Canada
Japanese expatriate sportspeople in China
Japanese female pair skaters
Olympic figure skaters of Japan
Sportspeople from Chiba Prefecture
World Figure Skating Championships medalists
World Junior Figure Skating Championships medalists